Baziège is a railway station in Baziège, Occitanie, southern France. Within TER Occitanie, it is part of lines 10 (Toulouse–Narbonne) and 25 (Portbou–Toulouse).

References

Railway stations in Haute-Garonne